Regenerator may refer to:
 Regenerative heat exchanger, a type of heat exchanger
 Regenerator (band), an independent record label set up in 2001
 Regenerator (Resident Evil), an enemy creature in the 2005 video game Resident Evil 4
 Regenerator – Live 1982, a UFO album
 Regenerator (EP), an EP by Autopilot Off
 Regenerator Telecommunication, a type of line repeater that includes a retiming function

See also 
 Generator (disambiguation)
 Regeneration (disambiguation)